Antonia Fräbel (born 25 January 1997) is a German cross-country skier.

She participated in the pursuit event at the FIS Nordic World Ski Championships 2021.

Cross-country skiing results
All results are sourced from the International Ski Federation (FIS).

Olympic Games

World Championships

World Cup

Season standings

References

External links

1997 births
Living people
German female cross-country skiers
Olympic cross-country skiers of Germany
Cross-country skiers at the 2022 Winter Olympics
People from Schmalkalden
Sportspeople from Thuringia